"The Bird and the Worm" is a song by the Used, released as the first single from their third studio album, Lies for the Liars. The song impacted radio on April 3, 2007. It is their highest charting single to date, peaking at number 9 on the Billboard Modern Rock Tracks chart and number 7 on the Billboard Bubbling Under Hot 100 Singles chart, equaling number  107 on the U.S. Hot 100 (their second single to make it into the Billboard singles chart). It received moderate video play on MTV and other music channels. The song is about Bert McCracken's brother, who is suffering from schizophrenia.

Track listings
All songs written by the Used.

CD Single

7-inch picture disc

2010 digital download
In 2010, a three-track version appeared on digital music stores featuring three versions of the song.

Music video
The video was filmed in Toronto, Canada on April 1–2, 2007. The video, which was directed by Lisa Mann, premiered on Monday, April 23, 2007 on MTV2 in the U.S. as part of their Unleashed program. The video is not available on MTV2.com by UK residents. UK TV channel Scuzz is now showing an edited version of the video; it only has a brief moment at the start through the key hole and then cuts out the sequence with Bert being stabbed in the wrist and then it healing itself. The part where Bert coughs up blood after drowning in the couch has also been cut. It also cuts out the part where Jeph offers Bert a lamb's head on a plate.

In other media
The song was used in CBS' Moonlight for their fifth episode, and an orchestral cover was used in the trailer for the 2010 remake of Clash of the Titans.  It was also played during Francesca Jones's rhythmic gymnastics routine at the 2012 London Olympics.

Charts

References

The Used songs
2007 singles
2007 songs
Warner Records singles
Reprise Records singles
Song recordings produced by John Feldmann
Songs written by Quinn Allman
Songs written by Jeph Howard
Songs written by Bert McCracken